Julio Elizardo Dujarric Lembcke (born December 28, 1977) is a Dominican sport shooter. Dujarric made his official debut for the 2004 Summer Olympics in Athens, where he placed twenty-first in men's skeet, with a score of 119 points, tying his position with seven other shooters including former Olympic champion Ennio Falco of Italy, and five-time Olympian Guillermo Alfredo Torres of Cuba.

At the 2008 Summer Olympics in Beijing, Dujarric competed for his second time in men's skeet shooting, where he placed thirty-first in the two-day qualifying rounds, with a total score of 110 points.

Additionally, Dujarric has participated in 7 World Championships. In 2001, he placed 76th with a score of 110. A year later, in 2002, he placed 78th  with a score of 112. Then, in 2005, he placed 19th with a score of 118. In 2010, he got 103rd place with a score of 111 points. A year later, in 2011, he placed 41st with a total score of 121.  In 2014, he placed 47th with 117 points. Lastly, in 2019, he placed 55th with a score of 117.

Dujarric has also participated in over 29 World Cups, 5 Continental American Championships, and 5 Pan American Games.

References

External links
NBC 2008 Olympics profile

Dominican Republic male sport shooters
Living people
Olympic shooters of the Dominican Republic
Shooters at the 2004 Summer Olympics
Shooters at the 2008 Summer Olympics
1977 births
Pan American Games competitors for the Dominican Republic
Shooters at the 2003 Pan American Games
Shooters at the 2015 Pan American Games
21st-century Dominican Republic people